Virginia Piper, the wife of Harry "Bobby" Piper, the chairman and CEO of the Minneapolis, Minnesota investment firm Piper, Jaffray and Hopwood, Inc., was kidnapped on July 27, 1972, while gardening outside her home in Orono, Minnesota. She was held chained to a tree for two nights in Jay Cooke State Park near Duluth. After receiving a ransom payment of $1 million from her husband, the kidnappers called an unconnected person and told them her location. Shortly afterward, Piper was found and released by the FBI.

The kidnapping received national attention for several reasons: the prominence of the victim and her husband; the time (broad daylight) and location (a large and opulent estate) of her kidnapping; the time of the arrest of the two men eventually charged with the crime—just days before the five-year statute of limitations expired in 1977; their acquittal on appeal in 1979; and the fact that only $4,000 of the ransom the kidnappers received was ever recovered.

In popular culture
Both the book All the President's Men (1974) and its 1976 film adaptation reference Carl Bernstein and Bob Woodward's The Washington Post article "Bug Suspect Got Campaign Funds" (August 1, 1972), which reports that Piper's friend and neighbor Kenneth H. Dahlberg, the Midwest finance chairman of the Committee for the Re-Election of the President, mentioned the kidnapping to Woodward.

References

Bibliography

1972 crimes in the United States
Federal Bureau of Investigation
Kidnappings in the United States
Crime in Minnesota
1972 in Minnesota